Object:Paradise (stylized as OBJECT:PARADISE) is a performance and poetics collective based in Prague, Czech Republic, formed by writers Tyko Say and Jeff Milton in 2018. The non-profit collective produces anti-poetry happenings, installations, and other multi-media works regarding their manifesto which calls to make poetry readings more dynamic, interdisciplinary, and contextually-dependent, in the name of a language happening.

History
Object:Paradise was formed in 2018 with the meeting of Tyko Say and Jeff Milton in the Ouky Douky cafe in Prague's Holešovice neighborhood where the two scheduled their first performance to involve characteristics of beat poetry, bebop jazz, and elements of theater, involving a cast composed majority of expats where English would be used as the lingua franca. This event would later be recognized as the first step of the collective's push to create a space where the poetry reading is promoted as a pragmatic performance rather than a literary event, prioritizing shared language and experience between audience and performer.

On November 13, 2019, Say and Milton self-released the collective's first album Object:Paradise Volume 1 at their event Channels of Communication where compiled VHS video from the Los Angeles collective Everything Is Terrible! was projected which would later be a common aesthetic and convention of their curations. Later on 20 January 2020, a documentary of the event under the same name was released, signifying the first video production of their events and manifesto in the works.

In July 2020, the collective began their transition from hosting events in private spaces to public spaces, specifically at their event Tunnel Vision(s) which was held in the Starý Vítkovský tunel where three stages were erected and the performed language could be interpreted separately depending on the audience's position within the tunnel. The cast of the event was composed primarily of the expat community of Prague and featured various acts such as body grooming, interpretative dance, protest, installation, and readings. The event would later be a critical happening in the writing of the collective's manifesto which would not only prioritize an interdisciplinary approach to poetics, but also highlight the importance of the space in which it occurs.

In 2020, the collective's second film, Oject:Praha, was released. Premiering at Prague Microfestival and later screened at the Versopolis Festival of Hope, the film documented scenes of Tunnel Vision(s) as well as other happenings in Prague from 2019-2020.

In April and May 2021, the collective had its first curated language installation, titled Now Showing with the New York-based Flow chart foundation where a curation of texts were projected from a high rise balcony before the Žižkov Television Tower in Prague. The installation featured texts from eight writers: Tyko Say, Marc Fischer, Michael Ashkin, Jason Geistweidt, David Levi Strauss, Kay Rosen, Max Goldfarb, and Norman Douglas. The objective of the projection, which occurred during the Covid-19 Pandemic, was to "bring poetry back to an accessible space: on the way to the store". Tyko Say's piece titled We was in turn projected in Hudson, New York in March of the same year.

In February 2022 the collective released their second album, OBJECT:PARADISE Volume II, on Seattle-based record label Sifter Grim, featuring over 20-Prague based artists and focusing primarily on topics concerning Prague's Žižkov neighborhood. The composition was released alongside a documentary, Object:Praha II, on the filming of the project.

Releases

Sound

 Object:Paradise Volume I (2019)
 Object:Paradise Volume II (2022)

Film

 Channels of Communication (2019) 
 Object:Praha I (2020)
 Object:Praha II (2022)
 ''Object:Praha III : The Manifesto (2022)

References 

Czech artist groups and collectives
Organizations based in Prague
2018 establishments in the Czech Republic
Performing groups established in 2018